The Association of Canadian Women Composers (ACWC) ( [AFCC]) is a not-for-profit organization that aims to promote the performance of works by women composers, to disseminate information about and to women composers in Canada and abroad, to encourage women composers to realize their creative potential, and to foster the highest standard of composition. Its membership categories include active, affiliate, associate, and composer-in-training.

The association fonds were accumulated from members of the Association of Canadian Women Composers between 1988 and 2011. The records were held by the ACWC Archivist until 2011, when they were donated to The Banff Centre Archives. The fonds consists of records generated by the association, including the Association's formation and its subsequent activities. Records concern the administration of the Association itself, public activities and initiatives intended to provide support for Canadian women composers.

History
The association was founded in 1980 by Carolyn Lomax (writer and broadcaster), Ann Southam, Mary Gardiner, and Maggie Burstyn. It was founded with a mandate to help fund and support emerging female performers and composers in order to address the lack of recognition for women composers in Canada. In 2002 Ann Southam, Mary Gardiner, Rhené Jaque, and Anita Sleeman became Honorary Life Members of the ACWC. As of 2021, composer Carol Ann Weaver chairs the association.

Notes

External links
 The Association of Canadian Women Composers
 Newsletter archive (2001 - 2009)

Music organizations based in Canada
Organizations established in 1980
1980 establishments in Canada